The First Security Bank Building in Salt Lake City, Utah, is a 12-story International Style commercial structure built in 1954. The building was designed by Wenceslao Sarmiento in consultation with W.G. Knoebel, chief designer for the Bank Building & Equipment Corporation of America, and local supervising architect Slack Winburn. It was listed on the National Register of Historic Places in 2005. Constructed for the First Security Corporation, the building was the first skyscraper built in Salt Lake City after the Great Depression. It was rehabilitated in 2004.

The First Security Bank Building has been compared with the United Nations Building, the Lever House, and the PSFS Building because of its glass curtain and cubic shapes, asymmetrical composition, and lack of ornament.

References

External links

		
National Register of Historic Places in Salt Lake City
Bank buildings on the National Register of Historic Places in Utah
International style architecture in Utah
Buildings and structures completed in 1954
1954 establishments in Utah